Siddhartha was the father of Mahavira, the 24th Jain Tirthankara. He was a Kshatriya King from the Ikshvaku dynasty and the ruler of the Nata, Ainwar(Light), Gyat or Jnatri clan in  Kshatriya Kundagrama, a suburb of Vaishali (Basarh in modern-day Bihar).He was married to Licchavi princess Trishala (also known as Videhadatta or Priyakarni) sister of King Chetaka of Vaishali.

The parents of Tirthankaras and their mothers in particular are worshipped among Jains and are frequently depicted in paintings and sculpture
According to the second chapter of the Śvētāmbara Acharanga Sutra, King Siddhartha and his family were devotees of Lord Parshvanatha.After his death, Nandivardhana became the king of the dynasty.

King Siddhartha and Queen Trishala died by observing Santhara (fast unto death) when Vardhamana was 28 years of age. Following his parents' demise, Vardhamana decided to take permission from his uncle Suparshva and elder brother Nandivardhana, who dissuaded him from renouncing worldly life for two more years because was unable to bear the loss of his parents as well as his brother, Vardhamana.

See also

References

Bibliography

6th-century BC Indian Jains
6th-century BC Indian monarchs
Jain monarchs
Mahavira